Scotland is a country that is part of the United Kingdom. Covering the northern third of the island of Great Britain, mainland Scotland has a  border with England to the southeast and is otherwise surrounded by the Atlantic Ocean to the north and west, the North Sea to the northeast and east, and the Irish Sea to the south. It also contains more than 790 islands, principally in the archipelagos of the Hebrides and the Northern Isles. Most of the population, including the capital Edinburgh, is concentrated in the Central Belt—the plain between the Scottish Highlands and the Southern Uplands—in the Scottish Lowlands.

Scotland is divided into 32 administrative subdivisions or local authorities, known as council areas. Glasgow City is the largest council area in terms of population, with Highland being the largest in terms of area. Limited self-governing power, covering matters such as education, social services and roads and transportation, is devolved from the Scottish Government to each subdivision. Scotland is the second-largest country in the United Kingdom, and accounted for 8.3% of the population in 2012.

The Kingdom of Scotland emerged in the 9th century, from the merging of the Gaelic Kingdom of Dál Riata and the Kingdom of the Picts, and continued to exist as an independent sovereign state until 1707. By inheritance in 1603, James VI of Scotland became king of England and Ireland, thus forming a personal union of the three kingdoms. Scotland subsequently entered into a political union with the Kingdom of England on 1 May 1707 to create the new Kingdom of Great Britain. The union also created the Parliament of Great Britain, which succeeded both the Parliament of Scotland and the Parliament of England. In 1801, the Kingdom of Great Britain entered into a political union with the Kingdom of Ireland to create the United Kingdom of Great Britain and Ireland (in 1922, the Irish Free State seceded from the United Kingdom, leading to the latter being officially renamed the United Kingdom of Great Britain and Northern Ireland in 1927).

Within Scotland, the monarchy of the United Kingdom has continued to use a variety of styles, titles and other royal symbols of statehood specific to the pre-union Kingdom of Scotland. The legal system within Scotland has also remained separate from those of England and Wales and Northern Ireland; Scotland constitutes a distinct jurisdiction in both public and private law. The continued existence of legal, educational, religious and other institutions distinct from those in the remainder of the UK have all contributed to the continuation of Scottish culture and national identity since the 1707 incorporating union with England.

In 1999, a Scottish Parliament was re-established, in the form of a devolved unicameral legislature comprising 129 members, having authority over many areas of domestic policy. The head of the Scottish Government is the first minister, who is supported by the deputy first minister. Scotland is represented in the United Kingdom Parliament by 59 members of parliament (MPs). It is also a member of the British–Irish Council, sending five members of the Scottish Parliament to the British–Irish Parliamentary Assembly, as well as being part of the Heads of Government Council, represented by the first minister, and the Inter-ministerial Standing Committee Council, represented by relevant cabinet secretaries and ministers in areas relating to education, finance and economy, environment and trade and investment.

Etymology 

Philip Freeman has speculated on the likelihood of a group of raiders adopting a name from an Indo-European root, *skot, citing the parallel in Greek , meaning "darkness, gloom". The Late Latin word  ('land of the Gaels') was initially used to refer to Ireland, and likewise in early Old English  was used for Ireland. By the 11th century at the latest, Scotia was being used to refer to (Gaelic-speaking) Scotland north of the River Forth, alongside Albania or Albany, both derived from the Gaelic . The use of the words Scots and Scotland to encompass all of what is now Scotland became common in the Late Middle Ages.

Prehistory 

Repeated glaciations, which covered the entire land mass of modern Scotland, destroyed any traces of human habitation that may have existed before the Mesolithic period. It is believed the first post-glacial groups of hunter-gatherers arrived in Scotland around 12,800 years ago, as the ice sheet retreated after the last glaciation. At the time, Scotland was covered in forests, had more bog-land, and the main form of transport was by water. These settlers began building the first known permanent houses on Scottish soil around 9,500 years ago, and the first villages around 6,000 years ago. The well-preserved village of Skara Brae on the mainland of Orkney dates from this period. Neolithic habitation, burial, and ritual sites are particularly common and well preserved in the Northern Isles and Western Isles, where a lack of trees led to most structures being built of local stone. Evidence of sophisticated pre-Christian belief systems is demonstrated by sites such as the Callanish Stones on Lewis and the Maes Howe on Orkney, which were built in the third millennium BC.

History

Early 

The first written reference to Scotland was in 320 BC by Greek sailor Pytheas, who called the northern tip of Britain "Orcas", the source of the name of the Orkney islands. During the first millennium BC, the society changed dramatically to a chiefdom model, as consolidation of settlement led to the concentration of wealth and underground stores of surplus food.

The Roman conquest of Britain was never completed, and most of modern Scotland was not brought under Roman political control. The first Roman incursion into Scotland occurred in 79 AD, when Agricola invaded Scotland; he defeated a Caledonian army at the Battle of Mons Graupius in 83 AD. After the Roman victory, Roman forts were briefly set along the Gask Ridge close to the Highland line, but by three years after the battle, the Roman armies had withdrawn to the Southern Uplands. Remains of Roman forts established in the 1st century have been found as far north as the Moray Firth. By the reign of the Roman emperor Trajan, Roman control had lapsed to Britain south of a line between the River Tyne and the Solway Firth. Along this line, Trajan's successor Hadrian erected Hadrian's Wall in northern England and the Limes Britannicus became the northern border of the Roman Empire. The Roman influence on the southern part of the country was considerable, and they introduced Christianity to Scotland.

The Antonine Wall was built from 142 at the order of Hadrian's successor Antoninus Pius, defending the Roman part of Scotland from the unadministered part of the island, north of a line between the Firth of Clyde and the Firth of Forth. The Roman invasion of Caledonia 208–210 was undertaken by emperors of the imperial Severan dynasty in response to the breaking of treaty by the Caledonians in 197, but permanent conquest of the whole of Great Britain was forestalled by Roman forces becoming bogged down in punishing guerrilla warfare and the death of the senior emperor Septimius Severus at Eboracum (York) after taking ill while on campaign. Although forts erected by the Roman army of the Severan campaign were placed near those established by Agricola and were clustered at the mouths of the glens in the Highlands, the Caledonians were again in revolt in 210–211 and these were overrun.

To the Roman historians Tacitus and Cassius Dio, the Scottish Highlands and the area north of the River Forth was called Caledonia. According to Cassius Dio, the inhabitants of Caledonia were the Caledonians and the Maeatae. Other ancient authors used the adjective "Caledonian" to pertain to anywhere in northern or inland Britain, often mentioning the region's people and animals, its cold climate, its pearls, and a noteworthy region of wooden hills which the 2nd-century AD Roman philosopher Ptolemy, in his Geography, described as being south-west of the Beauly Firth. The name Caledonia is echoed in the place names of Dunkeld, Rohallion, and Schiehallion.

The Great Conspiracy constituted a seemingly coordinated invasion against Roman rule in Britain in the later 4th century, which included the participation of the Gaelic Scoti and the Caledonians, who were then known as Picts by the Romans. This was defeated by the comes Theodosius, however, Roman military government was withdrawn from the island altogether by the early 5th century, resulting in the Anglo-Saxon settlement of Britain and the immigration of the Saxons to southeastern Scotland and the rest of eastern Great Britain.

Middle Ages 

Beginning in the sixth century, the area that is now Scotland was divided into three areas: Pictland, a patchwork of small lordships in central Scotland; the Anglo-Saxon Kingdom of Northumbria, which had conquered southeastern Scotland; and Dál Riata, which included territory in western Scotland and northern Ireland, and spread Gaelic language and culture into Scotland. These societies were based on the family unit and had sharp divisions in wealth, although the vast majority were poor and worked full-time in subsistence agriculture. The Picts kept slaves (mostly captured in war) through the ninth century.

Gaelic influence over Pictland and Northumbria was facilitated by the large number of Gaelic-speaking clerics working as missionaries. Operating in the sixth century on the island of Iona, Saint Columba was one of the earliest and best-known missionaries. The Vikings began to raid Scotland in the eighth century. Although the raiders sought slaves and luxury items, their main motivation was to acquire land. The oldest Norse settlements were in northwest Scotland, but they eventually conquered many areas along the coast. Old Norse entirely displaced Gaelic in the Northern Isles.

In the ninth century, the Norse threat allowed a Gael named Cináed mac Ailpín (Kenneth I) to seize power over Pictland, establishing a royal dynasty to which the modern monarchs trace their lineage, and marking the beginning of the end of Pictish culture. The kingdom of Cináed and his descendants, called Alba, was Gaelic in character but existed on the same area as Pictland. By the end of the tenth century, the Pictish language went extinct as its speakers shifted to Gaelic. From a base in eastern Scotland north of the River Forth and south of the River Spey, the kingdom expanded first southwards, into the former Northumbrian lands, and northwards into Moray. Around the turn of the millennium, there was a centralization in agricultural lands and the first towns began to be established.

In the twelfth and thirteenth centuries, much of Scotland was under the control of a single ruler. Initially, Gaelic culture predominated, but immigrants from France, England and Flanders steadily created a more diverse society, with the Gaelic language starting to be replaced by Scots. Altogether, a modern nation-state emerged from this. At the end of this period, war against England started the growth of a Scottish national consciousness. David I (1124–1153) and his successors centralized royal power and united mainland Scotland, capturing regions such as Moray, Galloway, and Caithness, although he did not succeed at extending his power over the Hebrides, which had been ruled by various Scottish clans following the death of Somerled in 1164. The system of feudalism was consolidated, with both Anglo-Norman incomers and native Gaelic chieftains being granted land in exchange for serving the king. The complex relationship with Scotland's southern neighbour over this period is characterised by Scottish kings making successful and unsuccessful attempts to exploit English political turmoil, followed by the longest period of peace between Scotland and England in the mediaeval period: from 12171296.

The death of Alexander III in March 1286 broke the succession line of Scotland's kings. Edward I of England arbitrated between various claimants for the Scottish crown. In return for surrendering Scotland's nominal independence, John Balliol was pronounced king in 1292. In 1294, Balliol and other Scottish lords refused Edward's demands to serve in his army against the French. Scotland and France sealed a treaty on 23 October 1295, known as the Auld Alliance. War ensued, and John was deposed by Edward who took personal control of Scotland. Andrew Moray and William Wallace initially emerged as the principal leaders of the resistance to English rule in the Wars of Scottish Independence, until Robert the Bruce was crowned king of Scotland in 1306. Victory at the Battle of Bannockburn in 1314 proved the Scots had regained control of their kingdom. In 1320 the world's first documented declaration of independence, the Declaration of Arbroath, won the support of Pope John XXII, leading to the legal recognition of Scottish sovereignty by the English Crown.

A civil war between the Bruce dynasty and their long-term rivals of the House of Comyn and House of Balliol lasted until the middle of the 14th century. Although the Bruce faction was successful, David II's lack of an heir allowed his half-nephew Robert II, the Lord High Steward of Scotland, to come to the throne and establish the House of Stewart. The Stewarts ruled Scotland for the remainder of the Middle Ages. The country they ruled experienced greater prosperity from the end of the 14th century through the Scottish Renaissance to the Reformation, despite the effects of the Black Death in 1349 and increasing division between Highlands and Lowlands. Multiple truces reduced warfare on the southern border.

Early modern period

16th century 

The Treaty of Perpetual Peace was signed in 1502 by James IV of Scotland and Henry VII of England. James married Henry's daughter, Margaret Tudor. James invaded England in support of France under the terms of the Auld Alliance and became the last British monarch to die in battle, at Flodden in 1513. The war with England during the minority years of Mary, Queen of Scots between 1543 to 1551 is known as the Rough Wooing.

In 1560, the Treaty of Edinburgh brought an end to the Siege of Leith and recognized the Protestant Elizabeth I as Queen of England. The Parliament of Scotland met and immediately adopted the Scots Confession, which signalled the Scottish Reformation's sharp break from papal authority and Roman Catholic teaching. The Catholic Mary, Queen of Scots, was forced to abdicate in 1567.

17th century 
In 1603, James VI, King of Scots inherited the thrones of the Kingdom of England and the Kingdom of Ireland in the Union of the Crowns, and moved to London. The first Union Jack was designed at James's behest, to be flown in addition to the St Andrew's Cross on Scots vessels at sea. James VI and I intended to create a single kingdom of Great Britain, but was thwarted in his attempt to do so by the Parliament of England, which supported the wrecking proposal that a full legal union be sought instead, a proposal to which the Scots Parliament would not assent, causing the king to withdraw the plan.

With the exception of a short period under the Protectorate, Scotland remained a separate state in the 17th century, but there was considerable conflict between the crown and the Covenanters over the form of church government. The military was strengthened, allowing the imposition of royal authority on the western Highland clans. The 1609 Statutes of Iona compelled the cultural integration of Hebridean clan leaders. In 1641 and again in 1643, the Parliament of Scotland unsuccessfully sought a union with England which was "federative" and not "incorporating", in which Scotland would retain a separate parliament. The issue of union split the parliament in 1648.

After the execution of the Scottish king at Whitehall in 1649, amid the Wars of the Three Kingdoms and its events in Scotland, Oliver Cromwell, the victorious Lord Protector, imposed the British Isles' first written constitution – the Instrument of Government – on Scotland in 1652 as part of the republican Commonwealth of England, Scotland, and Ireland. The Protectorate Parliament was the first Westminster parliament to include representatives nominally from Scotland. The monarchy of the House of Stuart was resumed with the Restoration in Scotland in 1660.

The Parliament of Scotland sought a commercial union with England in 1664; the proposal was rejected in 1668. In 1670 the Parliament of England rejected a proposed political union with Scotland. English proposals along the same lines were abandoned in 1674 and in 1685. The Battle of Altimarlach in 1680 was the last significant clan battle fought between highland clans. After the fall and flight into exile of the Catholic Stuart king, James VII and II the Glorious Revolution in Scotland and the Convention of Estates replaced the House of Stuart in favour of William III and Mary II who was Mary Stuart. The Scots Parliament rejected proposals for a political union in 1689. Jacobitism, the political support for the exiled Catholic Stuart dynasty, remained a threat to the security of the British state under the Protestant House of Orange and the succeeding House of Hanover until the defeat of the Jacobite rising of 1745.

In common with countries such as France, Norway, Sweden and Finland, Scotland experienced famines during the 1690s. Mortality, reduced childbirths and increased emigration reduced the population of parts of the country about 10–15%. In 1698, the Company of Scotland attempted a project to secure a trading colony on the Isthmus of Panama. Almost every Scottish landowner who had money to spare is said to have invested in the Darien scheme.

After another proposal from the English House of Lords was rejected in 1695, and a further Lords motion was voted down in the House of Commons in 1700, the Parliament of Scotland again rejected union in 1702. The failure of the Darien Scheme bankrupted the landowners who had invested, though not the burghs. Nevertheless, the nobles' bankruptcy, along with the threat of an English invasion, played a leading role in convincing the Scots elite to back a union with England. On 22 July 1706, the Treaty of Union was agreed between representatives of the Scots Parliament and the Parliament of England. The following year, twin Acts of Union were passed by both parliaments to create the united Kingdom of Great Britain with effect from 1 May 1707 with popular opposition and anti-union riots in Edinburgh, Glasgow, and elsewhere. The newly formed Parliament of Great Britain rejected proposals from the Parliament of Ireland that the third kingdom be incorporated in the union.

18th century 

With trade tariffs with England abolished, trade blossomed, especially with Colonial America. The clippers belonging to the Glasgow Tobacco Lords were the fastest ships on the route to Virginia. Until the American War of Independence in 1776, Glasgow was the world's premier tobacco port, dominating world trade. The disparity between the wealth of the merchant classes of the Scottish Lowlands and the ancient clans of the Scottish Highlands grew, amplifying centuries of division.

The deposed Jacobite Stuart claimants had remained popular in the Highlands and north-east, particularly amongst non-Presbyterians, including Roman Catholics and Episcopalian Protestants. Two major Jacobite risings launched in 1715 and 1745 failed to remove the House of Hanover from the British throne. The threat of the Jacobite movement to the United Kingdom and its monarchs effectively ended at the Battle of Culloden, Great Britain's last pitched battle.

The Scottish Enlightenment and the Industrial Revolution turned Scotland into an intellectual, commercial and industrial powerhouse — so much so Voltaire said "We look to Scotland for all our ideas of civilisation." With the demise of Jacobitism and the advent of the Union, thousands of Scots, mainly Lowlanders, took up numerous positions of power in politics, civil service, the army and navy, trade, economics, colonial enterprises and other areas across the nascent British Empire. Historian Neil Davidson notes "after 1746 there was an entirely new level of participation by Scots in political life, particularly outside Scotland." Davidson also states "far from being 'peripheral' to the British economy, Scotland – or more precisely, the Lowlands – lay at its core."

In the Highlands, clan chiefs gradually started to think of themselves more as commercial landlords than leaders of their people. These social and economic changes included the first phase of the Highland Clearances and, ultimately, the demise of clanship.

19th century 

The Scottish Reform Act 1832 increased the number of Scottish MPs and widened the franchise to include more of the middle classes. From the mid-century, there were increasing calls for Home Rule for Scotland and the post of Secretary of State for Scotland was revived. Towards the end of the century Prime Ministers of Scottish descent included William Gladstone, and the Earl of Rosebery. In the late 19th century the growing importance of the working classes was marked by Keir Hardie's success in the Mid Lanarkshire by-election, 1888, leading to the foundation of the Scottish Labour Party, which was absorbed into the Independent Labour Party in 1895, with Hardie as its first leader.

Glasgow became one of the largest cities in the world and known as "the Second City of the Empire" after London. After 1860, the Clydeside shipyards specialised in steamships made of iron (after 1870, made of steel), which rapidly replaced the wooden sailing vessels of both the merchant fleets and the battle fleets of the world. It became the world's pre-eminent shipbuilding centre. The industrial developments, while they brought work and wealth, were so rapid that housing, town-planning, and provision for public health did not keep pace with them, and for a time living conditions in some of the towns and cities were notoriously bad, with overcrowding, high infant mortality, and growing rates of tuberculosis.

While the Scottish Enlightenment is traditionally considered to have concluded toward the end of the 18th century, disproportionately large Scottish contributions to British science and letters continued for another 50 years or more, thanks to such figures as the physicists James Clerk Maxwell and Lord Kelvin, and the engineers and inventors James Watt and William Murdoch, whose work was critical to the technological developments of the Industrial Revolution throughout Britain. In literature, the most successful figure of the mid-19th century was Walter Scott. His first prose work, Waverley in 1814, is often called the first historical novel. It launched a highly successful career that probably more than any other helped define and popularise Scottish cultural identity. In the late 19th century, a number of Scottish-born authors achieved international reputations, such as Robert Louis Stevenson, Arthur Conan Doyle, J. M. Barrie and George MacDonald. Scotland also played a major part in the development of art and architecture. The Glasgow School, which developed in the late 19th century, and flourished in the early 20th century, produced a distinctive blend of influences including the Celtic Revival the Arts and Crafts movement, and Japonism, which found favour throughout the modern art world of continental Europe and helped define the Art Nouveau style. Proponents included architect and artist Charles Rennie Mackintosh.

This period saw a process of rehabilitation for Highland culture. In the 1820s, as part of the Romantic revival, tartan and the kilt were adopted by members of the social elite, not just in Scotland, but across Europe, prompted by the popularity of Macpherson's Ossian cycle and then Walter Scott's Waverley novels. The Highlands remained poor and the only part of mainland Britain with a recurrent famine. A small range of products were exported from the region, which had negligible industrial production and a continued population growth that tested the subsistence agriculture. These problems, and the desire to improve agriculture and profits were the driving forces of the ongoing Highland Clearances, in which many of the population of the Highlands suffered eviction as lands were enclosed, principally so that they could be used for sheep farming. The first phase of the clearances followed patterns of agricultural change throughout Britain. The second phase was driven by overpopulation, the Highland Potato Famine and the collapse of industries that had relied on the wartime economy of the Napoleonic Wars. The population of Scotland grew steadily in the 19th century, from 1,608,000 in the census of 1801 to 2,889,000 in 1851 and 4,472,000 in 1901. Even with the development of industry, there were not enough good jobs. As a result, during the period 1841–1931, about 2 million Scots migrated to North America and Australia, and another 750,000 Scots relocated to England.

After prolonged years of struggle in the Kirk, the Evangelicals gained control of the General Assembly in 1834 and passed the Veto Act, which allowed congregations to reject unwanted "intrusive" presentations to livings by patrons. The following "Ten Years' Conflict" of legal and political wrangling ended in defeat for the non-intrusionists in the civil courts. The result was a schism from the church by some of the non-intrusionists led by Dr Thomas Chalmers, known as the Great Disruption of 1843. Roughly a third of the clergy, mainly from the North and Highlands, formed the separate Free Church of Scotland. In the late 19th century growing divisions between fundamentalist Calvinists and theological liberals resulted in a further split in the Free Church as the rigid Calvinists broke away to form the Free Presbyterian Church in 1893. Catholic emancipation in 1829 and the influx of large numbers of Irish immigrants, particularly after the famine years of the late 1840s, mainly to the growing lowland centres like Glasgow, led to a transformation in the fortunes of Catholicism. In 1878, despite opposition, a Roman Catholic ecclesiastical hierarchy was restored to the country, and Catholicism became a significant denomination within Scotland.

Industrialisation, urbanisation and the Disruption of 1843 all undermined the tradition of parish schools. From 1830 the state began to fund buildings with grants; then from 1846 it was funding schools by direct sponsorship; and in 1872 Scotland moved to a system like that in England of state-sponsored largely free schools, run by local school boards. The historic University of Glasgow became a leader in British higher education by providing the educational needs of youth from the urban and commercial classes, as opposed to the upper class. The University of St Andrews pioneered the admission of women to Scottish universities. From 1892 Scottish universities could admit and graduate women and the numbers of women at Scottish universities steadily increased until the early 20th century.

Caused by the advent of refrigeration and imports of lamb, mutton and wool from overseas, the 1870s brought with them a collapse of sheep prices and an abrupt halt in the previous sheep farming boom. Land prices subsequently plummeted, too, and accelerated the process of the so-called "Balmoralisation" of Scotland, an era in the second half of the 19th century that saw an increase in tourism and the establishment of large estates dedicated to field sports like deer stalking and grouse shooting, especially in the Scottish Highlands. The process was named after Balmoral estate, purchased by Queen Victoria in 1848, that fuelled the romanticisation of upland Scotland and initiated an influx of the newly wealthy acquiring similar estates in the following decades. In the late 19th century just 118 people owned half of Scotland, with nearly 60 per cent of the whole country being part of shooting estates. While their relative importance has somewhat declined due to changing recreational interests throughout the 20th century, deer stalking and grouse shooting remain of prime importance on many private estates in Scotland.

20th century 

Scotland played a major role in the British effort in the First World War. It especially provided manpower, ships, machinery, fish and money. With a population of 4.8 million in 1911, Scotland sent over half a million men to the war, of whom over a quarter died in combat or from disease, and 150,000 were seriously wounded. Field Marshal Sir Douglas Haig was Britain's commander on the Western Front.

The war saw the emergence of a radical movement called "Red Clydeside" led by militant trades unionists. Formerly a Liberal stronghold, the industrial districts switched to Labour by 1922, with a base among the Irish Catholic working-class districts. Women were especially active in building neighbourhood solidarity on housing issues. The "Reds" operated within the Labour Party with little influence in Parliament and the mood changed to passive despair by the late 1920s.

The shipbuilding industry expanded by a third and expected renewed prosperity, but instead, a serious depression hit the economy by 1922 and it did not fully recover until 1939. The interwar years were marked by economic stagnation in rural and urban areas, and high unemployment. Indeed, the war brought with it deep social, cultural, economic, and political dislocations. Thoughtful Scots pondered their declension, as the main social indicators such as poor health, bad housing, and long-term mass unemployment, pointed to terminal social and economic stagnation at best, or even a downward spiral. Service abroad on behalf of the Empire lost its allure to ambitious young people, who left Scotland permanently. The heavy dependence on obsolescent heavy industry and mining was a central problem, and no one offered workable solutions. The despair reflected what Finlay (1994) describes as a widespread sense of hopelessness that prepared local business and political leaders to accept a new orthodoxy of centralised government economic planning when it arrived during the Second World War.

During the Second World War, Scotland was targeted by Nazi Germany largely due to its factories, shipyards, and coal mines. Cities such as Glasgow and Edinburgh were targeted by German bombers, as were smaller towns mostly located in the central belt of the country. Perhaps the most significant air-raid in Scotland was the Clydebank Blitz of March 1941, which intended to destroy naval shipbuilding in the area. 528 people were killed and 4,000 homes totally destroyed.

Perhaps Scotland's most unusual wartime episode occurred in 1941 when Rudolf Hess flew to Renfrewshire, possibly intending to broker a peace deal through the Duke of Hamilton. Before his departure from Germany, Hess had given his adjutant, Karlheinz Pintsch, a letter addressed to Hitler that detailed his intentions to open peace negotiations with the British. Pintsch delivered the letter to Hitler at the Berghof around noon on 11 May. Albert Speer later said Hitler described Hess's departure as one of the worst personal blows of his life, as he considered it a personal betrayal. Hitler worried that his allies, Italy and Japan, would perceive Hess's act as an attempt by Hitler to secretly open peace negotiations with the British.

As in World War I, Scapa Flow in Orkney served as an important Royal Navy base. Attacks on Scapa Flow and Rosyth gave RAF fighters their first successes downing bombers in the Firth of Forth and East Lothian. The shipyards and heavy engineering factories in Glasgow and Clydeside played a key part in the war effort, and suffered attacks from the Luftwaffe, enduring great destruction and loss of life. As transatlantic voyages involved negotiating north-west Britain, Scotland played a key part in the battle of the North Atlantic. Shetland's relative proximity to occupied Norway resulted in the Shetland bus by which fishing boats helped Norwegians flee the Nazis, and expeditions across the North Sea to assist resistance.

Scottish industry came out of the depression slump by a dramatic expansion of its industrial activity, absorbing unemployed men and many women as well. The shipyards were the centre of more activity, but many smaller industries produced the machinery needed by the British bombers, tanks and warships. Agriculture prospered, as did all sectors except for coal mining, which was operating mines near exhaustion. Real wages, adjusted for inflation, rose 25% and unemployment temporarily vanished. Increased income, and the more equal distribution of food, obtained through a tight rationing system, dramatically improved the health and nutrition.

After 1945, Scotland's economic situation worsened due to overseas competition, inefficient industry, and industrial disputes. Only in recent decades has the country enjoyed something of a cultural and economic renaissance. Economic factors contributing to this recovery included a resurgent financial services industry, electronics manufacturing, (see Silicon Glen), and the North Sea oil and gas industry. The introduction in 1989 by Margaret Thatcher's government of the Community Charge (widely known as the Poll Tax) one year before the rest of Great Britain, contributed to a growing movement for Scottish control over domestic affairs. Following a referendum on devolution proposals in 1997, the Scotland Act 1998 was passed by the British Parliament, which established a devolved Scottish Parliament and Scottish Government with responsibility for most laws specific to Scotland. The Scottish Parliament was reconvened in Edinburgh on 4 July 1999. The first to hold the office of first minister of Scotland was Donald Dewar, who served until his sudden death in 2000.

21st century 

The Scottish Parliament Building at Holyrood opened in October 2004 after lengthy construction delays and running over budget. The Scottish Parliament's form of proportional representation (the additional member system) resulted in no one party having an overall majority for the first three Scottish parliament elections. The pro-independence Scottish National Party led by Alex Salmond achieved an overall majority in the 2011 election, winning 69 of the 129 seats available. The success of the SNP in achieving a majority in the Scottish Parliament paved the way for the September 2014 referendum on Scottish independence. The majority voted against the proposition, with 55% voting no to independence. More powers, particularly in relation to taxation, were devolved to the Scottish Parliament after the referendum, following cross-party talks in the Smith Commission.

Geography and natural history 

The mainland of Scotland comprises the northern third of the land mass of the island of Great Britain, which lies off the north-west coast of Continental Europe. The Atlantic Ocean borders the west coast and the North Sea is to the east.

The territorial extent of Scotland is generally that established by the 1237 Treaty of York between Scotland and the Kingdom of England and the 1266 Treaty of Perth between Scotland and Norway. Important exceptions include the Isle of Man, which having been lost to England in the 14th century is now a crown dependency outside of the United Kingdom; the island groups Orkney and Shetland, which were acquired from Norway in 1472; and Berwick-upon-Tweed, lost to England in 1482

The geographical centre of Scotland lies a few miles from the village of Newtonmore in Badenoch.

Geology and geomorphology 

The whole of Scotland was covered by ice sheets during the Pleistocene ice ages and the landscape is much affected by glaciation. From a geological perspective, the country has three main sub-divisions.

The Highlands and Islands lie to the north and west of the Highland Boundary Fault, which runs from Arran to Stonehaven. This part of Scotland largely comprises ancient rocks from the Cambrian and Precambrian, which were uplifted during the later Caledonian orogeny. It is interspersed with igneous intrusions of a more recent age, remnants of which formed mountain massifs such as the Cairngorms and Skye Cuillins. In north-eastern mainland Scotland weathering of rock that occurred before the Last Ice Age has shaped much of the landscape.

A significant exception to the above are the fossil-bearing beds of Old Red Sandstones found principally along the Moray Firth coast. The Highlands are generally mountainous and the highest elevations in the British Isles are found here. Scotland has over 790 islands divided into four main groups: Shetland, Orkney, and the Inner Hebrides and Outer Hebrides. There are numerous bodies of freshwater including Loch Lomond and Loch Ness. Some parts of the coastline consist of machair, a low-lying dune pasture land.

The Central Lowlands is a rift valley mainly comprising Paleozoic formations. Many of these sediments have economic significance for it is here that the coal and iron bearing rocks that fuelled Scotland's industrial revolution are found. This area has also experienced intense volcanism, Arthur's Seat in Edinburgh being the remnant of a once much larger volcano. This area is relatively low-lying, although even here hills such as the Ochils and Campsie Fells are rarely far from view.

They lie south of a second fault line (the Southern Uplands fault) that runs from Girvan to Dunbar. The geological foundations largely comprise Silurian deposits laid down some 400 to 500 million years ago. The Southern Uplands is home to Scotland's highest village, Wanlockhead ( above sea level).

Climate 

The climate of most of Scotland is temperate and oceanic, and tends to be very changeable. As it is warmed by the Gulf Stream from the Atlantic, it has much milder winters (but cooler, wetter summers) than areas on similar latitudes, such as Labrador, southern Scandinavia, the Moscow region in Russia, and the Kamchatka Peninsula on the opposite side of Eurasia. Temperatures are generally lower than in the rest of the UK, with the temperature of  recorded at Braemar in the Grampian Mountains, on 11 February 1895, the coldest ever recorded anywhere in the UK. Winter maxima average  in the Lowlands, with summer maxima averaging .

The west of Scotland is usually warmer than the east, owing to the influence of Atlantic ocean currents and the colder surface temperatures of the North Sea. Tiree, in the Inner Hebrides, is one of the sunniest places in the country: it had more than 300 hours of sunshine in May 1975. Rainfall varies widely across Scotland. The western highlands of Scotland are the wettest, with annual rainfall in a few places exceeding . In comparison, much of lowland Scotland receives less than  annually. Heavy snowfall is not common in the lowlands, but becomes more common with altitude. Braemar has an average of 59 snow days per year, while many coastal areas average fewer than 10 days of lying snow per year.

Flora and fauna 

Scotland's wildlife is typical of the north-west of Europe, although several of the larger mammals such as the lynx, brown bear, wolf, elk and walrus were hunted to extinction in historic times. There are important populations of seals and internationally significant nesting grounds for a variety of seabirds such as gannets. The golden eagle is something of a national icon.

On the high mountain tops, species including ptarmigan, mountain hare and stoat can be seen in their white colour phase during winter months. Remnants of the native Scots pine forest exist and within these areas the Scottish crossbill, the UK's only endemic bird species and vertebrate, can be found alongside capercaillie, Scottish wildcat, red squirrel and pine marten. Various animals have been re-introduced, including the white-tailed eagle in 1975, the red kite in the 1980s, and there have been experimental projects involving the beaver and wild boar. Today, much of the remaining native Caledonian Forest lies within the Cairngorms National Park and remnants of the forest remain at 84 locations across Scotland. On the west coast, remnants of ancient Celtic Rainforest still remain, particularly on the Taynish peninsula in Argyll, these forests are particularly rare due to high rates of deforestation throughout Scottish history.

The flora of the country is varied incorporating both deciduous and coniferous woodland as well as moorland and tundra species. Large-scale commercial tree planting and management of upland moorland habitat for the grazing of sheep and field sport activities like deer stalking and driven grouse shooting impacts the distribution of indigenous plants and animals. The UK's tallest tree is a grand fir planted beside Loch Fyne, Argyll in the 1870s, and the Fortingall Yew may be 5,000 years old and is probably the oldest living thing in Europe. Although the number of native vascular plants is low by world standards, Scotland's substantial bryophyte flora is of global importance.

Demographics 

The population of Scotland at the 2001 Census was 5,062,011. This rose to 5,295,400, the highest ever, at the 2011 Census. The most recent ONS estimate, for mid-2019, was 5,463,300.

In the 2011 Census, 62% of Scotland's population stated their national identity as 'Scottish only', 18% as 'Scottish and British', 8% as 'British only', and 4% chose 'other identity only'.

Although Edinburgh is the capital of Scotland, the largest city is Glasgow, which has just over 584,000 inhabitants. The Greater Glasgow conurbation, with a population of almost 1.2 million, is home to nearly a quarter of Scotland's population. The Central Belt is where most of the main towns and cities are located, including Glasgow, Edinburgh, Dundee, and Perth. Scotland's only major city outside the Central Belt is Aberdeen. The Scottish Lowlands host 80% of the total population, where the Central Belt accounts for 3.5 million people.

In general, only the more accessible and larger islands remain inhabited. Currently, fewer than 90 remain inhabited. The Southern Uplands are essentially rural in nature and dominated by agriculture and forestry. Because of housing problems in Glasgow and Edinburgh, five new towns were designated between 1947 and 1966. They are East Kilbride, Glenrothes, Cumbernauld, Livingston, and Irvine.

Immigration since World War II has given Glasgow, Edinburgh, and Dundee small South Asian communities. In 2011, there were an estimated 49,000 ethnically Pakistani people living in Scotland, making them the largest non-White ethnic group. Since the enlargement of the European Union more people from Central and Eastern Europe have moved to Scotland, and the 2011 census indicated that 61,000 Poles live there.

Scotland has three officially recognised languages: English, Scots, and Scottish Gaelic. Scottish Standard English, a variety of English as spoken in Scotland, is at one end of a bipolar linguistic continuum, with broad Scots at the other. Scottish Standard English may have been influenced to varying degrees by Scots. The 2011 census indicated that 63% of the population had "no skills in Scots". Others speak Highland English. Gaelic is mostly spoken in the Western Isles, where a large proportion of people still speak it. Nationally, its use is confined to 1% of the population. The number of Gaelic speakers in Scotland dropped from 250,000 in 1881 to 60,000 in 2008.

There are many more people with Scottish ancestry living abroad than the total population of Scotland. In the 2000 Census, 9.2 million Americans self-reported some degree of Scottish descent. Ulster's Protestant population is mainly of lowland Scottish descent, and it is estimated that there are more than 27 million descendants of the Scots-Irish migration now living in the US. In Canada, the Scottish-Canadian community accounts for 4.7 million people. About 20% of the original European settler population of New Zealand came from Scotland.

In August 2012, the Scottish population reached an all-time high of 5.25 million people. The reasons given were that, in Scotland, births were outnumbering the number of deaths, and immigrants were moving to Scotland from overseas. In 2011, 43,700 people moved from Wales, Northern Ireland or England to live in Scotland.

The total fertility rate (TFR) in Scotland is below the replacement rate of 2.1 (the TFR was 1.73 in 2011). The majority of births are to unmarried women (51.3% of births were outside of marriage in 2012).

Life expectancy for those born in Scotland between 2012 and 2014 is 77.1 years for males and 81.1 years for females. This is the lowest of any of the four countries of the UK.

Religion 

Forms of Christianity have dominated religious life in what is now the Scotland for more than 1,400 years.
In 2011 just over half (54%) of the Scottish population reported being a Christian while nearly 37% reported not having a religion in a 2011 census.
Since the Scottish Reformation of 1560, the national church (the Church of Scotland, also known as The Kirk) has been Protestant in classification and Reformed in theology. Since 1689 it has had a Presbyterian system of church government and enjoys independence from the state. Its membership dropped just below 300,000 in 2020 (5% of the total population)  The Church operates a territorial parish structure, with every community in Scotland having a local congregation.

Scotland also has a significant Roman Catholic population, 19% professing that faith, particularly in Greater Glasgow and the north-west. After the Reformation, Roman Catholicism in Scotland continued in the Highlands and some western islands like Uist and Barra, and it was strengthened during the 19th century by immigration from Ireland. Other Christian denominations in Scotland include the Free Church of Scotland, and various other Presbyterian offshoots. Scotland's third largest church is the Scottish Episcopal Church.

There are an estimated 75,000 Muslims in Scotland (about 1.4% of the population), and significant but smaller Jewish, Hindu and Sikh communities, especially in Glasgow. The Samyé Ling monastery near Eskdalemuir, which celebrated its 40th anniversary in 2007, is the first Buddhist monastery in western Europe.

Politics and government 

The head of state of the United Kingdom is the monarch, who is King Charles III. The monarchy of the United Kingdom continues to use a variety of styles, titles and other royal symbols of statehood specific to pre-union Scotland, including: the Royal Standard of Scotland, the Royal coat of arms used in Scotland together with its associated Royal Standard, royal titles including that of Duke of Rothesay, certain Great Officers of State, the chivalric Order of the Thistle and, since 1999, reinstating a ceremonial role for the Crown of Scotland after a 292-year hiatus. Queen Elizabeth II's regnal numbering caused controversy in 1953 because there had never been an Elizabeth I in Scotland. MacCormick v Lord Advocate was a legal action was brought in Scotland's Court of Session by the Scottish Covenant Association to contest the right of the Queen to entitle herself "Elizabeth II" within Scotland, but the Crown won the appeal against the case's dismissal, since as royal titulature was legislated for by the Royal Titles Act 1953 and a matter of royal prerogative.

Scotland has limited self-government within the United Kingdom, as well as representation in the British Parliament. Executive and legislative powers respectively have been devolved to the Scottish Government and the Scottish Parliament at Holyrood in Edinburgh since 1999. The British Parliament retains control over reserved matters specified in the Scotland Act 1998, including taxes, social security, defence, international relations and broadcasting. The Scottish Parliament has legislative authority for all other areas relating to Scotland. It initially had only a limited power to vary income tax, but powers over taxation and social security were significantly expanded by the Scotland Acts of 2012 and 2016. The 2016 Act gave the Scottish Government powers to manage the affairs of the Crown Estate in Scotland, leading to the creation of Crown Estate Scotland.

The Scottish Parliament can give legislative consent over devolved matters back to the British Parliament by passing a Legislative Consent Motion if United Kingdom-wide legislation is considered more appropriate for a certain issue. The programmes of legislation enacted by the Scottish Parliament have seen a divergence in the provision of public services compared to the rest of the UK. For instance, university education and some care services for the elderly are free at point of use in Scotland, while fees are paid in the rest of the UK. Scotland was the first country in the UK to ban smoking in enclosed public places.

The Scottish Parliament is a unicameral legislature with 129 members (MSPs): 73 of them represent individual constituencies and are elected on a first-past-the-post system; the other 56 are elected in eight different electoral regions by the additional member system. MSPs normally serve for a five-year period. The Parliament nominates one of its Members, who is then appointed by the monarch to serve as first minister. Other ministers are appointed by the first minister and serve at his/her discretion. Together they make up the Scottish Government, the executive arm of the devolved government. The Scottish Government is headed by the first minister, who is accountable to the Scottish Parliament and is the minister of charge of the Scottish Government. The first minister is also the political leader of Scotland. The Scottish Government also comprises the deputy first minister, who deputises for the first minister during a period of absence. Alongside the deputy first minister's requirements as Deputy, the minister also has a cabinet ministerial responsibility. The current Scottish Government has nine cabinet secretaries and there are 15 other ministers who work alongside the cabinet secretaries in their appointed areas.

In the 2021 election, the Scottish National Party (SNP) won 64 of the 129 seats available. Nicola Sturgeon, the leader of the SNP, has been the first minister since November 2014. The Scottish Conservatives, Scottish Labour, the Scottish Liberal Democrats and the Scottish Greens also have representation in the Parliament. The next Scottish Parliament election is due to be held on 7 May 2026.

Scotland is represented in the British House of Commons by 59 MPs elected from territory-based Scottish constituencies. In the 2019 general election, the SNP won 48 of the 59 seats. This represented a significant increase from the 2017 general election, when the SNP won 35 seats. Conservative, Labour and Liberal Democrat parties also represent Scottish constituencies in the House of Commons. The next general election is scheduled for 2 May 2024. The Scotland Office represents the British government in Scotland on reserved matters and represents Scottish interests within the government. The Scotland Office is led by the Secretary of State for Scotland, who sits in the Cabinet of the United Kingdom. Conservative MP Alister Jack has held the position since July 2019.

Devolved government relations 

Since 1999, relations between the devolved governments of Scotland, Wales and Northern Ireland with the Government of the United Kingdom has been conducted under the banner of Intergovernmental Relations. The First Minister, other cabinet secrateries   and junior ministers of the Scottish Government are in daily communication relating to areas of national and international interest, discussing joint policy making and strengthening approaches to working together. A Memorandum of Understanding, created in 1999, lays emphasis on the principles of good communication, consultation and co-operation. Overall, accountability for intergovernmental relations is the responsibility of the First Minister. The First Minister is a member of the Heads of Government Council ("The Council") (previously the Joint Ministerial Committee). Other cabinet secreraties and junior ministers within the Scottish Government participate in tier two (the Inter-ministerial Standing Committee) and tier 3 (the Inter-ministerial Group) of The Council which may include areas including education, finance and economy, investment and trade and rural affairs.

Since devolution in 1999, Scotland has devolved stronger working relations across the two other devolved governments, the Welsh Government and Northern Ireland Executive. Whilst there are no formal concordats between the Scottish Government, Welsh Government and Northern Ireland Executive, ministers from each devolved government meet at various points throughout the year at various events such as the British-Irish Council and also meet to discuss matters and issues that are devolved to each government. The Scottish Government considers the successful re-establishment of the Plenary, and establishment of the Domestic fora to be important facets of the relationship with the British Government and the other devolved administrations.

In the aftermath of the United Kingdom's decision to withdraw from the European Union in 2016, the Scottish Government has called for there to be a joint approach from each of the devolved governments. In early 2017, the devolved governments met to discuss Brexit and agree on Brexit strategies from each devolved government which lead for Theresa May to issue a statement that stated that the devolved governments will not have a central role or decision-making process in the Brexit process, but that the central government plans to "fully engage" Scotland in talks alongside the governments of Wales and Northern Ireland.

International diplomacy 

Whilst foreign policy remains a reserved matter, the Scottish Government may promote the economy and Scottish interests on the world stage and encourage foreign businesses, international devolved, regional and central governments to invest in Scotland. Whilst the first minister usually undertakes a number of international visits to promote Scotland, international relations, European and Commonwealth relations are also included within the portfolios of both the Cabinet Secretary for Culture, Tourism and External Affairs (responsible for international development) and the Minister for International Development and Europe (responsible for European Union relations and international relations).

Whilst an independent sovereign nation, Scotland had a close "special relationship" with France (known then as the Kingdom of France). In 1295, both Scotland and France signed what became known as the Auld Alliance in Paris, which acted as a military and diplomatic alliance between English invasion and expansion. The French military sought the assistance of Scotland in 1415 during the Battle of Agincourt which was close to bringing the Kingdom of France to collapse. The Auld Alliance was seen as important for Scotland and its position within Europe, having signed a treaty of military, economic and diplomatic co-operation with a wealthy European nation. There had been an agreement between Scotland and France that allowed citizens of both countries to hold dual citizenship, which was revoked by the French Government in 1903. In recent times, there have been arguments that indicate that the Auld Alliance was never formally ended by either Scotland or France, and that many elements of the treaty may remain in place today. Scotland and France still have a special relationship, with a Statement of Intent being signed in 2013 which committed both Scotland and France to building on shared history, friendship, co-operation between governments and cultural exchange programmes.

During the 31st G8 summit in 2005, the first minister of Scotland Jack McConnell welcomed each head of government of the G8 nations to the country's Glasgow Prestwick Airport on behalf of prime minister Tony Blair. At the same time, McConnell and the then Scottish Executive pioneered the way forward to launch what would become the Scotland Malawi Partnership which co-ordinates Scottish activities to strengthen existing links with Malawi. During McConnell's time as first minister, several relations with Scotland, including Scottish and Russian relations strengthened following a visit by President of Russia Vladimir Putin to Edinburgh. McConnell, speaking at the end, highlighted that the visit by Putin was a "post-devolution" step towards "Scotland regaining its international identity".

Under the Salmond administration, Scotland's trade and investment deals with countries such as China and Canada, where Salmond established the Canada Plan 2010–2015 which aimed to strengthen "the important historical, cultural and economic links" between both Canada and Scotland. To promote Scotland's interests and Scottish businesses in North America, there is a Scottish Affairs Office located in Washington, D.C. with the aim to promoting Scotland in both the United States and Canada.

During a 2017 visit to the United States, the first minister Nicola Sturgeon met Jerry Brown, Governor of California, where both signed an agreement committing both the Government of California and the Scottish Government to work together to tackle climate change, as well as Sturgeon signing a £6.3 million deal for Scottish investment from American businesses and firms promoting trade, tourism and innovation. During an official visit to the Republic of Ireland in 2016, Sturgeon stated that is it "important for Ireland and Scotland and the whole of the British Isles that Ireland has a strong ally in Scotland". During the same engagement, Sturgeon became the first head of government to address the Seanad Éireann, the upper house of the Oireachtas (the Irish parliament).

International Offices

Scotland has a network of eight international offices across the world, these are located in:

 Beijing (Scottish Government Beijing Office) (British Embassy)
 Berlin (Scottish Government Berlin Office)
 Brussels (Scotland House Brussels)
 Copenhagen (Scottish Government Copenhagen Office)
 Dublin (Scottish Government Dublin Office) (British Embassy)
 London (Scotland House London)
 Ottawa (Scottish Government Ottawa Office) (British High Commission)
 Paris (Scottish Government Office) (British Embassy)
 Washington DC (Scottish Government Washington DC Office) (British Embassy)

Constitutional changes 

A policy of devolution had been advocated by the three main British political parties with varying enthusiasm during recent history. A previous Labour leader, John Smith, described the revival of a Scottish parliament as the "settled will of the Scottish people". The devolved Scottish Parliament was created after a referendum in 1997 found majority support for both creating the Parliament and granting it limited powers to vary income tax.

The Scottish National Party (SNP), which supports Scottish independence, was first elected to form the Scottish Government in 2007. The new government established a "National Conversation" on constitutional issues, proposing a number of options such as increasing the powers of the Scottish Parliament, federalism, or a referendum on Scottish independence from the United Kingdom. In rejecting the last option, the three main opposition parties in the Scottish Parliament created a commission to investigate the distribution of powers between devolved Scottish and UK-wide bodies. The Scotland Act 2012, based on proposals by the commission, was subsequently enacted devolving additional powers to the Scottish Parliament.

In August 2009 the SNP proposed a bill to hold a referendum on independence in November 2010. Opposition from all other major parties led to an expected defeat. After the 2011 Scottish Parliament election gave the SNP an overall majority in the Scottish Parliament, the 2014 Scottish independence referendum was held on 18 September. The referendum resulted in a rejection of independence, by 55.3% to 44.7%. During the campaign, the three main parties in the British Parliament pledged to extend the powers of the Scottish Parliament. An all-party commission chaired by Robert Smith, Baron Smith of Kelvin was formed, which led to a further devolution of powers through the Scotland Act 2016.

Following the European Union Referendum Act 2015, the 2016 United Kingdom European Union membership referendum was held on 23 June 2016 on Britain's membership of the European Union. A majority in the United Kingdom voted to withdraw from the EU, whilst a majority within Scotland voted to remain a member.

The first minister, Nicola Sturgeon, announced the following day that as a result a new independence referendum was "highly likely". On 31 January 2020, the United Kingdom formally withdrew from the European Union. At Holyrood, Sturgeon's governing SNP continues to campaign for such a referendum; in December 2019 a formal request for the powers to hold one under Section 30 of the Scotland Act was submitted. In June 2022, Sturgeon announced plans to hold a referendum on 19 October 2023. At Westminster, the governing second Johnson ministry of the Conservative Party is opposed to another referendum and has refused the first minister's request. Because constitutional affairs are reserved matters under the Scotland Act, the Scottish Parliament would again have to be granted temporary additional powers under Section 30 in order to hold a legally binding vote.

Scotland has historical and cultural ties with northern countries outside the British Isles, such as the countries of Scandinavia. Scottish Government policy advocates for stronger political relations with the Nordic and Baltic countries, which has resulted in some Nordic-inspired policies being adopted such as baby boxes.

Administrative subdivisions 

Historical subdivisions of Scotland included the mormaerdom, stewartry, earldom, burgh, parish, county and regions and districts. Some of these names are still sometimes used as geographical descriptors.

Modern Scotland is subdivided in various ways depending on the purpose. In local government, there have been 32 single-tier council areas since 1996, whose councils are responsible for the provision of all local government services. Decisions are made by councillors who are elected at local elections every five years. The head of each council is usually the Lord Provost alongside the Leader of the council, with a Chief Executive being appointed as director of the council area. Community Councils are informal organisations that represent specific sub-divisions within each council area.

In the Scottish Parliament, there are 73 constituencies and eight regions. For the Parliament of the United Kingdom, there are 59 constituencies. Until 2013, the Scottish fire brigades and police forces were based on a system of regions introduced in 1975. For healthcare and postal districts, and a number of other governmental and non-governmental organisations such as the churches, there are other long-standing methods of subdividing Scotland for the purposes of administration.

City status in the United Kingdom is conferred by letters patent. There are eight cities in Scotland: Aberdeen, Dundee, Dunfermline, Edinburgh, Glasgow, Inverness, Stirling and Perth.

Law and criminal justice 

Scots law has a basis derived from Roman law, combining features of both uncodified civil law, dating back to the Corpus Juris Civilis, and common law with medieval sources. The terms of the Treaty of Union with England in 1707 guaranteed the continued existence of a separate legal system in Scotland from that of England and Wales. Prior to 1611, there were several regional law systems in Scotland, most notably Udal law in Orkney and Shetland, based on old Norse law. Various other systems derived from common Celtic or Brehon laws survived in the Highlands until the 1800s.

Scots law provides for three types of courts responsible for the administration of justice: civil, criminal and heraldic. The supreme civil court is the Court of Session, although civil appeals can be taken to the Supreme Court of the United Kingdom (or before 1 October 2009, the House of Lords). The High Court of Justiciary is the supreme criminal court in Scotland. The Court of Session is housed at Parliament House, in Edinburgh, which was the home of the pre-Union Parliament of Scotland with the High Court of Justiciary and the Supreme Court of Appeal currently located at the Lawnmarket. The sheriff court is the main criminal and civil court, hearing most cases. There are 49 sheriff courts throughout the country. District courts were introduced in 1975 for minor offences and small claims. These were gradually replaced by Justice of the Peace Courts from 2008 to 2010. The Court of the Lord Lyon regulates heraldry.

For three centuries the Scots legal system was unique for being the only national legal system without a parliament. This ended with the advent of the Scottish Parliament in 1999, which legislates for Scotland. Many features within the system have been preserved. Within criminal law, the Scots legal system is unique in having three possible verdicts: "guilty", "not guilty" and "not proven". Both "not guilty" and "not proven" result in an acquittal, typically with no possibility of retrial in accordance with the rule of double jeopardy. A retrial can hear new evidence at a later date that might have proven conclusive in the earlier trial at first instance, where the person acquitted subsequently admits the offence or where it can be proved that the acquittal was tainted by an attempt to pervert the course of justice – see the provisions of the Double Jeopardy (Scotland) Act 2011. Many laws differ between Scotland and the other parts of the United Kingdom, and many terms differ for certain legal concepts. Manslaughter, in England and Wales, is broadly similar to culpable homicide in Scotland, and arson is called wilful fire raising. Indeed, some acts considered crimes in England and Wales, such as forgery, are not so in Scotland. Procedure also differs. Scots juries, sitting in criminal cases, consist of fifteen jurors, which is three more than is typical in many countries.

The Scottish Prison Service (SPS) manages the prisons in Scotland, which collectively house over 8,500 prisoners. The Cabinet Secretary for Justice is responsible for the Scottish Prison Service within the Scottish Government.

Health care 

Health care in Scotland is mainly provided by NHS Scotland, Scotland's public health care system. This was founded by the National Health Service (Scotland) Act 1947 (later repealed by the National Health Service (Scotland) Act 1978) that took effect on 5 July 1948 to coincide with the launch of the NHS in England and Wales. Prior to 1948, half of Scotland's landmass was already covered by state-funded health care, provided by the Highlands and Islands Medical Service. Healthcare policy and funding is the responsibility of the Scottish Government's Health Directorates.

In 2014, the NHS in Scotland had around 140,000 staff.

Economy 

Scotland has a Western-style open mixed economy closely linked with the rest of the UK and the wider world. Traditionally, the Scottish economy was dominated by heavy industry underpinned by shipbuilding in Glasgow, coal mining and steel industries. Petroleum related industries associated with the extraction of North Sea oil have also been important employers from the 1970s, especially in the north-east of Scotland. De-industrialisation during the 1970s and 1980s saw a shift from a manufacturing focus towards a more service-oriented economy.

Scotland's gross domestic product (GDP), including oil and gas produced in Scottish waters, was estimated at £150 billion for the calendar year 2012. In 2014, Scotland's per capita GDP was one of the highest in the EU. As of April 2019 the Scottish unemployment rate was 3.3%, below the UK's overall rate of 3.8%, and the Scottish employment rate was 75.9%.

Edinburgh is the financial services centre of Scotland, with many large finance firms based there, including: Lloyds Banking Group (owners of HBOS); the Government-owned Royal Bank of Scotland and Standard Life. Edinburgh was ranked 15th in the list of world financial centres in 2007, but fell to 37th in 2012, following damage to its reputation, and in 2016 was ranked 56th out of 86. Its status had returned to 17th by 2020.

In 2014, total Scottish exports (excluding intra-UK trade) were estimated to be £27.5 billion. Scotland's primary exports include whisky, electronics and financial services. The United States, Netherlands, Germany, France, and Norway constitute the country's major export markets.

Whisky is one of Scotland's more known goods of economic activity. Exports increased by 87% in the decade to 2012 and were valued at £4.3 billion in 2013, which was 85% of Scotland's food and drink exports. It supports around 10,000 jobs directly and 25,000 indirectly. It may contribute £400–682 million to Scotland, rather than several billion pounds, as more than 80% of whisky produced is owned by non-Scottish companies. A briefing published in 2002 by the Scottish Parliament Information Centre (SPICe) for the Scottish Parliament's Enterprise and Life Long Learning Committee stated that tourism accounted for up to 5% of GDP and 7.5% of employment.

Scotland was one of the industrial powerhouses of Europe from the time of the Industrial Revolution onwards, being a world leader in manufacturing. This left a legacy in the diversity of goods and services which Scotland produces, from textiles, whisky and shortbread to jet engines, buses, computer software, ships, avionics and microelectronics, as well as banking, insurance, investment management and other related financial services. In common with most other advanced industrialised economies, Scotland has seen a decline in the importance of both manufacturing industries and primary-based extractive industries. This has been combined with a rise in the service sector of the economy, which has grown to be the largest sector in Scotland.

Currency 

Although the Bank of England is the central bank for the UK, three Scottish clearing banks issue Sterling banknotes: the Bank of Scotland, the Royal Bank of Scotland and the Clydesdale Bank. The issuing of banknotes by retail banks in Scotland is subject to the Banking Act 2009, which repealed all earlier legislation under which banknote issuance was regulated, and the Scottish and Northern Ireland Banknote Regulations 2009.

The value of the Scottish banknotes in circulation in 2013 was £3.8 billion, underwritten by the Bank of England using funds deposited by each clearing bank, under the Banking Act 2009, in order to cover the total value of such notes in circulation.

Military 

Of the money spent on UK defence, about £3.3 billion can be attributed to Scotland as of 2018/2019.

Scotland had a long military tradition predating the Treaty of Union with England; the Scots Army and Royal Scots Navy were (with the exception of the Atholl Highlanders, Europe's only legal private army) merged with their English counterparts to form the Royal Navy and the British Army, which together form part of the British Armed Forces. Numerous Scottish regiments have at various times existed in the British Army. Distinctively Scottish regiments in the British Army include the Scots Guards, the Royal Scots Dragoon Guards and the 154 (Scottish) Regiment RLC, an Army Reserve regiment of the Royal Logistic Corps. In 2006, as a result of the Delivering Security in a Changing World white paper, the Scottish infantry regiments in the Scottish Division were amalgamated to form the Royal Regiment of Scotland. As a result of the Cameron–Clegg coalition's Strategic Defence and Security Review 2010, the Scottish regiments of the line in the British Army infantry, having previously formed the Scottish Division, were reorganised into the Scottish, Welsh and Irish Division in 2017. Before the formation of the Scottish Division, the Scottish infantry was organised into a Lowland Brigade and Highland Brigade.

Because of their topography and perceived remoteness, parts of Scotland have housed many sensitive defence establishments. Between 1960 and 1991, the Holy Loch was a base for the US fleet of Polaris ballistic missile submarines. Scapa Flow was the major Fleet base for the Royal Navy until 1956.

Scotland's Scapa Flow was the main base for the Royal Navy in the 20th century. As the Cold War intensified in 1961, the United States deployed Polaris ballistic missiles, and submarines, in the Firth of Clyde's Holy Loch. Public protests from CND campaigners proved futile. The Royal Navy successfully convinced the government to allow the base because it wanted its own Polaris submarines, and it obtained them in 1963. The RN's nuclear submarine base opened with four  Polaris submarines at the expanded Faslane Naval Base on the Gare Loch. The first patrol of a Trident-armed submarine occurred in 1994, although the US base was closed at the end of the Cold War.

A single front-line Royal Air Force base is located in Scotland. RAF Lossiemouth, located in Moray, is the most northerly air defence fighter base in the United Kingdom and is home to three fast-jet squadrons equipped with the Eurofighter Typhoon.

Education 

The Scottish education system has always been distinct from the rest of the United Kingdom, with a characteristic emphasis on a broad education. In the 15th century, the Humanist emphasis on education cumulated with the passing of the Education Act 1496, which decreed that all sons of barons and freeholders of substance should attend grammar schools to learn "perfyct Latyne", resulting in an increase in literacy among a male and wealthy elite. In the Reformation, the 1560 First Book of Discipline set out a plan for a school in every parish, but this proved financially impossible. In 1616 an act in Privy council commanded every parish to establish a school. By the late seventeenth century there was a largely complete network of parish schools in the lowlands, but in the Highlands basic education was still lacking in many areas. Education remained a matter for the church rather than the state until the Education (Scotland) Act 1872.

The Curriculum for Excellence, Scotland's national school curriculum, presently provides the curricular framework for children and young people from age 3 to 18. All 3- and 4-year-old children in Scotland are entitled to a free nursery place. Formal primary education begins at approximately 5 years old and lasts for 7 years (P1–P7); children in Scotland study National Qualifications of the Curriculum for Excellence between the ages of 14 and 18. The school leaving age is 16, after which students may choose to remain at school and study further qualifications. A small number of students at certain private schools may follow the English system and study towards GCSEs and A and AS-Levels instead.

There are fifteen Scottish universities, some of which are amongst the oldest in the world. The four universities founded before the end of the 16th century – the University of St Andrews, the University of Glasgow, the University of Aberdeen and the University of Edinburgh – are collectively known as the ancient universities of Scotland, all of which rank among the 200 best universities in the world in the THE rankings, with Edinburgh placing in the top 50. Scotland had more universities per capita in QS' World University Rankings' top 100 in 2012 than any other nation. The country produces 1% of the world's published research with less than 0.1% of the world's population, and higher education institutions account for 9% of Scotland's service sector exports. Scotland's University Courts are the only bodies in Scotland authorised to award degrees.

Tuition fees are handled by the Student Awards Agency Scotland (SAAS), which pays the fees of what it defines as "Young Students". Young Students are defined as those under 25, without children, marriage, civil partnership or cohabiting partner, who have not been outside of full-time education for more than three years. Fees must be paid by those outside the young student definition, typically from £1,200 to £1,800 for undergraduate courses, dependent on year of application and type of qualification. Postgraduate fees can be up to £3,400. The system has been in place since 2007 when graduate endowments were abolished. Labour's education spokesperson Rhona Brankin criticised the Scottish system for failing to address student poverty.

Scotland's universities are complemented in the provision of Further and Higher Education by 43 colleges. Colleges offer National Certificates, Higher National Certificates, and Higher National Diplomas. These Group Awards, alongside Scottish Vocational Qualifications, aim to ensure Scotland's population has the appropriate skills and knowledge to meet workplace needs. In 2014, research reported by the Office for National Statistics found that Scotland was the most highly educated country in Europe and among the most well-educated in the world in terms of tertiary education attainment, with roughly 40% of people in Scotland aged 16–64 educated to NVQ level 4 and above. Based on the original data for EU statistical regions, all four Scottish regions ranked significantly above the European average for completion of tertiary-level education by 25- to 64-year-olds.

Kilmarnock Academy in East Ayrshire is one of only two schools in the UK, and the only school in Scotland, to have educated two Nobel Prize Laureates – Alexander Fleming, discoverer of Penicillin, and John Boyd Orr, 1st Baron Boyd-Orr, for his scientific research into nutrition and his work as the first Director-General of the United Nations Food and Agriculture Organization (FAO).

Culture

Scottish music 

Scottish music is a significant aspect of the nation's culture, with both traditional and modern influences. A famous traditional Scottish instrument is the Great Highland bagpipe, a wind instrument consisting of three drones and a melody pipe (called the chanter), which are fed continuously by a reservoir of air in a bag. Bagpipe bands, featuring bagpipes and various types of drums, and showcasing Scottish music styles while creating new ones, have spread throughout the world. The clàrsach (harp), fiddle and accordion are also traditional Scottish instruments, the latter two heavily featured in Scottish country dance bands. There are many successful Scottish bands and individual artists in varying styles including Annie Lennox, Amy Macdonald, Runrig, Belle and Sebastian, Boards of Canada, Camera Obscura, Cocteau Twins, Deacon Blue, Franz Ferdinand, Susan Boyle, Emeli Sandé, Texas, The View, The Fratellis, Twin Atlantic, Bay City Rollers and Biffy Clyro. Other Scottish musicians include Shirley Manson, Paolo Nutini, Andy Stewart and Calvin Harris, all of whom have achieved considerable commercial success in international music markets Shirley Manson performed at the 1999 opening of the Scottish Parliament concert at Princes Street Gardens with her band Garbage.

Rock band Simple Minds were the most commercially successful Scottish band of the 1980s, having found success in international markets such as the United States, Canada, Australia and New Zealand, whilst pop singer Lewis Capaldi was recognised as the best selling artist in the UK in 2019.

Awards in recognition of Scottish musical talent in Scotland include the Scottish Music Awards, Scottish Album of the Year Award, the Scots Trad Music Awards and the BBC Radio Scotland Young Traditional Musician award.

Literature 

Scotland has a literary heritage dating back to the early Middle Ages. The earliest extant literature composed in what is now Scotland was in Brythonic speech in the 6th century, but is preserved as part of Welsh literature. Later medieval literature included works in Latin, Gaelic, Old English and French. The first surviving major text in Early Scots is the 14th-century poet John Barbour's epic Brus, focusing on the life of Robert I, and was soon followed by a series of vernacular romances and prose works. In the 16th century, the crown's patronage helped the development of Scots drama and poetry, but the accession of James VI to the English throne removed a major centre of literary patronage and Scots was sidelined as a literary language. Interest in Scots literature was revived in the 18th century by figures including James Macpherson, whose Ossian Cycle made him the first Scottish poet to gain an international reputation and was a major influence on the European Enlightenment. It was also a major influence on Robert Burns, whom many consider the national poet, and Walter Scott, whose Waverley Novels did much to define Scottish identity in the 19th century. Towards the end of the Victorian era a number of Scottish-born authors achieved international reputations as writers in English, including Robert Louis Stevenson, Arthur Conan Doyle, J. M. Barrie and George MacDonald. In the 20th century the Scottish Renaissance saw a surge of literary activity and attempts to reclaim the Scots language as a medium for serious literature. Members of the movement were followed by a new generation of post-war poets including Edwin Morgan, who would be appointed the first Scots Makar by the inaugural Scottish government in 2004. From the 1980s Scottish literature enjoyed another major revival, particularly associated with a group of writers including Irvine Welsh. Scottish poets who emerged in the same period included Carol Ann Duffy, who, in May 2009, was the first Scot named the monarch's Poet Laureate.

Celtic connections 

As one of the Celtic nations, Scotland and Scottish culture are represented at interceltic events at home and over the world. Scotland hosts several music festivals including Celtic Connections (Glasgow), and the Hebridean Celtic Festival (Stornoway). Festivals celebrating Celtic culture, such as Festival Interceltique de Lorient (Brittany), the Pan Celtic Festival (Ireland), and the National Celtic Festival (Portarlington, Australia), feature elements of Scottish culture such as language, music and dance.

National identity 

The image of St. Andrew, martyred while bound to an X-shaped cross, first appeared in the Kingdom of Scotland during the reign of William I. Following the death of King Alexander III in 1286 an image of Andrew was used on the seal of the Guardians of Scotland who assumed control of the kingdom during the subsequent interregnum. Use of a simplified symbol associated with Saint Andrew, the saltire, has its origins in the late 14th century; the Parliament of Scotland decreeing in 1385 that Scottish soldiers should wear a white Saint Andrew's Cross on the front and back of their tunics. Use of a blue background for the Saint Andrew's Cross is said to date from at least the 15th century. Since 1606 the saltire has also formed part of the design of the Union Flag. There are numerous other symbols and symbolic artefacts, both official and unofficial, including the thistle, the nation's floral emblem (celebrated in the song, The Thistle o' Scotland), the Declaration of Arbroath, incorporating a statement of political independence made on 6 April 1320, the textile pattern tartan that often signifies a particular Scottish clan and the royal Lion Rampant flag. Highlanders can thank James Graham, 3rd Duke of Montrose, for the repeal in 1782 of the Act of 1747 prohibiting the wearing of tartans.

Although there is no official national anthem of Scotland, Flower of Scotland is played on special occasions and sporting events such as football and rugby matches involving the Scotland national teams and since 2010 is also played at the Commonwealth Games after it was voted the overwhelming favourite by participating Scottish athletes. Other currently less popular candidates for the National Anthem of Scotland include Scotland the Brave, Highland Cathedral, Scots Wha Hae and A Man's A Man for A' That.

St Andrew's Day, 30 November, is the national day, although Burns' Night tends to be more widely observed, particularly outside Scotland. In 2006, the Scottish Parliament passed the St Andrew's Day Bank Holiday (Scotland) Act 2007, designating the day an official bank holiday. Tartan Day is a recent innovation from Canada.

The national animal of Scotland is the unicorn, which has been a Scottish heraldic symbol since the 12th century.

Cuisine 

Scottish cuisine has distinctive attributes and recipes of its own but shares much with wider British and European cuisine as a result of local and foreign influences, both ancient and modern. Traditional Scottish dishes exist alongside international foodstuffs brought about by migration. Scotland's natural larder of game, dairy products, fish, fruit, and vegetables is the chief factor in traditional Scots cooking, with a high reliance on simplicity and a lack of spices from abroad, as these were historically rare and expensive. Irn-Bru is the most common Scottish carbonated soft drink, often described as "Scotland's other national drink" (after whisky). During the Late Middle Ages and early modern era, French cuisine played a role in Scottish cookery due to cultural exchanges brought about by the "Auld Alliance", especially during the reign of Mary, Queen of Scots. Mary, on her return to Scotland, brought an entourage of French staff who are considered responsible for revolutionising Scots cooking and for some of Scotland's unique food terminology.

Media 

National newspapers such as the Daily Record, The Herald, The Scotsman and The National are all produced in Scotland. Important regional dailies include the Evening News in Edinburgh, The Courier in Dundee in the east, and The Press and Journal serving Aberdeen and the north. Scotland is represented at the Celtic Media Festival, which showcases film and television from the Celtic countries. Scottish entrants have won many awards since the festival began in 1980.

Television in Scotland is largely the same as UK-wide broadcasts. The national broadcaster is BBC Scotland, a division of the BBC. It runs three national television stations BBC One Scotland, BBC Scotland channel and the Gaelic-language broadcaster BBC Alba, and the national radio stations, BBC Radio Scotland and BBC Radio nan Gàidheal, amongst others. The main Scottish commercial television station is STV which broadcasts on two of the three ITV regions of Scotland.

Scotland has a number of production companies which produce films and television programmes for Scottish, British and international audiences. Popular films associated with Scotland through Scottish production or being filmed in Scotland include Braveheart (1995), Highlander (1986), Trainspotting (1996), Red Road (2006), Neds (2010), The Angel's Share (2012), Brave (2012) and Outlaw King (2018). Popular television programmes associated with Scotland include the long running BBC Scotland soap opera River City which has been broadcast since 2002, Still Game, a popular Scottish sitcom broadcast throughout the United Kingdom (2002–2007, revived in 2016), Rab C. Nesbitt, Two Doors Down and Take the High Road. The Rig (2023) was the first Amazon Prime Video production to be filmed and produced entirely in Scotland.

Wardpark Studios in Cumbernauld is one of Scotland's television and film production studios where the television programme Outlander is produced. Dumbarton Studios, located in Dumbarton is largely used for BBC Scotland programming, used for the filming and production of television programmes such as Still Game, River City, Two Doors Down, and Shetland.

Sport 

Scotland hosts its own national sporting competitions and has independent representation at several international sporting events, including the FIFA World Cup, the UEFA Nations League, the UEFA European Championship, the Rugby Union World Cup, the Rugby League World Cup, the Cricket World Cup, the Netball World Cup and the Commonwealth Games. Scotland has its own national governing bodies, such as the Scottish Football Association (the second oldest national football association in the world) and the Scottish Rugby Union. Variations of football have been played in Scotland for centuries, with the earliest reference dating back to 1424.

Football 

The world's first official international association football match was held in 1872 and was the idea of C. W. Alcock of the Football Association which was seeking to promote Association Football in Scotland. The match took place at the West of Scotland Cricket Club's Hamilton Crescent ground in the Partick area of Glasgow. The match was between Scotland and England and resulted in a 0–0 draw. Following this, the newly developed football became the most popular sport in Scotland. The Scottish Cup was first contested in 1873. Queen's Park F.C., in Glasgow, is probably the oldest association football club in the world outside England.

The Scottish Football Association (SFA), the second-oldest national football association in the world, is the main governing body for Scottish association football, and a founding member of the International Football Association Board (IFAB) which governs the Laws of the Game. As a result of this key role in the development of the sport Scotland is one of only four countries to have a permanent representative on the IFAB; the other four representatives being appointed for set periods by FIFA.

The SFA also has responsibility for the Scotland national football team, whose supporters are commonly known as the "Tartan Army". , Scotland are ranked as the 50th best national football team in the FIFA World Rankings. The national team last attended the World Cup in France in 1998, but finished last in their group stage. The Scotland women's team have achieved more recent success, qualifying for both Euro 2017 and the 2019 World Cup. , they were ranked as the 22nd best women's national team in the FIFA Rankings.

Scottish clubs have achieved some success in European competitions, with Celtic winning the European Cup in 1967, Rangers and Aberdeen winning the UEFA Cup Winners' Cup in 1972 and 1983 respectively, and Aberdeen also winning the UEFA Super Cup in 1983. Celtic, Rangers and Dundee United have also reached European finals. The most recent appearance by a Scottish club in a European final was by Rangers in 2022.

Golf 

With the modern game of golf originating in 15th-century Scotland, the country is promoted as the home of golf. To many golfers the Old Course in the Fife town of St Andrews, an ancient links course dating to before 1552, is considered a site of pilgrimage. In 1764, the standard 18-hole golf course was created at St Andrews when members modified the course from 22 to 18 holes. The world's oldest golf tournament, and golf's first major, is The Open Championship, which was first played on 17 October 1860 at Prestwick Golf Club, in Ayrshire, Scotland, with Scottish golfers winning the earliest majors. There are many other famous golf courses in Scotland, including Carnoustie, Gleneagles, Muirfield, and Royal Troon.

Rugby

The Scottish Football Union was founded on Monday 3 March 1873 at a meeting held at Glasgow Academy, Elmbank Street, Glasgow. The Scottish Rugby Union is the second oldest rugby union in the world. In 1924 the SFU changed its name to become the Scottish Rugby Union. International games were played at Inverleith from 1899 to 1925 when Murrayfield was opened.

The SRU owns Murrayfield Stadium which is the main home ground of the Scottish national team. Scotland is represented in rugby tournaments by the Scotland national rugby union team. As of 4 December 2022, Scotland are 7th in the World Rugby Rankings. The Scotland rugby team played their first official test match, winning 1–0 against England at Raeburn Place in 1871. Scotland has competed in the Six Nations from the inaugural tournament in 1883, winning it 14 times outright—including the last Five Nations in 1999—and sharing it another 8. The Rugby World Cup was introduced in 1987 and Scotland have competed in all nine competitions, the most recent being in 2019, where they failed to reach the quarter-finals. Their best finish came in 1991, where they lost to the All Blacks in the third place play-off.

Scotland competes with the England rugby team annually for the Calcutta Cup. Each year, this fixture is played out as part of the Six Nations, with Scotland having last won in 2023.

Other sports 
Other distinctive features of the national sporting culture include the Highland games, curling and shinty. In boxing, Scotland has had 13 world champions, including Ken Buchanan, Benny Lynch and Jim Watt. Scotland has also been successful in motorsport, particularly in Formula One. Notable drivers include; David Coulthard, Jim Clark, Paul Di Resta, and Jackie Stewart. In IndyCar, Dario Franchitti has won 4 consecutive IndyCar world championships.

Scotland has competed at every Commonwealth Games since 1930 and has won 356 medals in total—91 Gold, 104 Silver and 161 Bronze. Edinburgh played host to the Commonwealth Games in 1970 and 1986, and most recently Glasgow in 2014.

Infrastructure

Energy 

Scotland's primary sources for energy are provided through renewable energy (61.8%), nuclear (25.7%) and fossil fuel generation (10.9%).

In Scotland, 98.6% of all electricity used was from renewable sources. This is minus net exports. Between October 2021 and September 2022 63.1% of all electricity generated in Scotland was from renewable sources, 83.6% was classed as low carbon and 14.5% was from fossil fuels.

The Scottish Government has a target to have the equivalent of 50% of the energy for Scotland's heat, transport and electricity consumption to be supplied from renewable sources by 2030.

Transport

Air 

Scotland has five international airports operating scheduled services to Europe, North America and Asia, as well as domestic services to England, Northern Ireland and Wales.

 Aberdeen Airport
 Edinburgh Airport
 Glasgow Airport
 Glasgow Prestwick Airport
 Inverness Airport

Highlands and Islands Airports operates eleven airports across the Highlands, Orkney, Shetland and the Western Isles, which are primarily used for short distance, public service operations, although Inverness Airport has a number of scheduled flights to destinations across the UK and mainland Europe.

Edinburgh Airport is currently Scotland's busiest airport handling over 13 million passengers in 2017. It is also the UK's 6th busiest airport.

British Airways, EasyJet, Jet2, and Ryanair operate the majority of flights between Scotland and other major UK and European airports.

Four airlines are based in Scotland:

 Directflight
 Hebridean Air Services
 Loch Lomond Seaplanes
 Loganair

Rail 

Network Rail owns and operates the fixed infrastructure assets of the railway system in Scotland, while the Scottish Government retains overall responsibility for rail strategy and funding in Scotland. In 2018–19 there were 102million passenger journeys on Scottish railways.

The East and West Coast Main Lines are the two cross-border railways that connect the networks of Scotland and England. London North Eastern Railway (LNER) provides inter-city rail journeys on the former between Inverness, Aberdeen and Edinburgh to London King’s Cross via York, while Avanti West Coast runs services on the latter from either Edinburgh or Glasgow Central to London Euston with some services serving Birmingham New Street. TransPennine Express, Lumo, CrossCountry, Caledonian Sleeper and ScotRail also operate services to England. Domestic rail services within Scotland are operated by ScotRail. Glasgow’s Subway is one of the four underground urban rail networks in the UK (the others being in London, Newcastle and Liverpool). Edinburgh has a tramway to and from the airport.

During the time of British Rail, the West Coast Main Line from London Euston to Glasgow Central was electrified in the early 1970s, followed by the East Coast Main Line in the late 1980s. British Rail created the ScotRail brand. When British Rail existed, many railway lines in Strathclyde were electrified. Strathclyde Passenger Transport Executive was at the forefront with the acclaimed "largest electrified rail network outside London". Some parts of the network are electrified, but there are no electrified lines in the Highlands, Angus, Aberdeenshire, the cities of Dundee or Aberdeen, or Perth & Kinross, and none of the islands have a rail link. Trains serving railheads such as Wemyss Bay, Kyle of Lochalsh and Mallaig are often timed to connect with ferries to some of Scotland’s islands.

Road 
The Scottish motorways and major trunk roads are managed by Transport Scotland. The remainder of the road network is managed by the Scottish local authorities in each of their areas.

Water 
Regular ferry services operate between the Scottish mainland and outlying islands. Ferries serving both the inner and outer Hebrides are principally operated by the state-owned enterprise Caledonian MacBrayne.

Services to the Northern Isles are operated by Serco. Other routes, served by multiple companies, connect southwest Scotland to Northern Ireland. DFDS Seaways operated a freight-only Rosyth – Zeebrugge ferry service, until a fire damaged the vessel DFDS were using. A passenger service was also operated between 2002 and 2010.

Additional routes are operated by local authorities.

See also 

 Celtic languages
 Celts
 Ethnic groups in Europe
 Outline of Scotland

References

Sources

Further reading 

 Devine, T. M. [1999] (2000). The Scottish Nation 1700–2000 (New edition). London: Penguin. 
 Donnachie, Ian and George Hewitt. Dictionary of Scottish History. (2001). 384 pp.
 Keay, John, and Julia Keay. Collins Encyclopedia of Scotland (2nd ed. 2001), 1101pp; 4000 articles; emphasis on history
 Koch, J. T. Celtic Culture: a Historical Encyclopedia (ABC-CLIO, 2006), 999pp.
 MacGibbon, David and Ross, Thomas, The ecclesiastical architecture of Scotland from the earliest Christian times to the seventeenth century; vol. 3/3, (1897).
 Tabraham, Chris, and Colin Baxter. The Illustrated History of Scotland (2004) excerpt and text search
 Trevor-Roper, Hugh, The Invention of Scotland: Myth and History, Yale, 2008, 
 Watson, Fiona, Scotland; From Prehistory to the Present. Tempus, 2003. 286 pp.
 Wilson, Neil. Lonely Planet Scotland (2013)
 Wormald, Jenny, Scotland: A History (2005) excerpt and text search

External links 

 , the official online gateway to Scotland managed by the Scottish Government.
Visit Scotland, official site of Scotland's national tourist board.
 Scottish Government, official site of the Scottish Government.
.
 
 

 
Autonomous regions
Celtic nations
English-speaking countries and territories
Great Britain
Island countries
NUTS 1 statistical regions of the United Kingdom
United Kingdom by country